Arthur Jermy Mounteney Jephson (1859–1908) was an English merchant seaman and army officer. He became an adventurer and African explorer, who accompanied H. M. Stanley on the Emin Pasha Relief Expedition, 1887–1889.

Emin Pasha Relief Expedition

Jephson's diary from the expedition was published half a century after his death, and provides a record of the late Victorian African expeditions, of which this expedition was to be the last.

References and further reading

Primary sources

 Jephson, A. J. Mounteney : Diary, Edited by Dorothy Middleton, Hakluyt Society, 1969
 Stanley, Henry Morton : In Darkest Africa, 1890

Secondary works
 Liebowitz, Daniel; Pearson, Charles : The Last Expedition: Stanley's Mad Journey Through the Congo, 2005, 
 Moorehead, Alan : The White Nile, London, 1960, 1971
 Smith, Iain R. : The Emin Pasha Relief Expedition 1886-1890, Oxford University Press, 1972
 Gould, Tony : In Limbo: The Story of Stanley's Rear Column, David & Charles 1980 
Note: The name is also spelled "Mountenay"

Notes

1859 births
1908 deaths
English explorers
Explorers of Africa